The following is a full list of members of the Order of Manitoba, both past and current, in order of their date of appointment.

1999
 Peter Liba,

2000
 Edward R. Schreyer, 
 W. John McKeag, 
 Pearl McGonigal, 
 Yvon Dumont, KStJ
 Duff Roblin, 
 Howard R. Pawley, 
 Israel H. Asper, 
 Robert Beamish, 
 Burton Cummings, 
 James M. C. Daly
 R. E. "Reg" Forbes
 Edwin Jebb
 Sol Kanee, 
 Mary Kelekis
 Susan Lambert
 Leo Mol, 
 Alfred M. Monnin, 
 William Norrie, 
 David Northcott
 Pamela Blanche Rebello
 Strini Reddy
 Mary Richard
 George Taylor Richardson
 Roger Marshall Smith
 Arnold T. Spohr
 Baldur R. Stefansson, 
 Bramwell Bernard Tovey

2001
 Lloyd Axworthy, 
 Clarence Lyle Barber, 
 Heather Bishop, OC
 Hyacinth Colomb
 Gary Albert Filmon, 
 Richard Martin
 Carol Shields, 
 Gwendolyn E. Wishart

2002
 Bill Brace
 Saul M. Cherniack, 
 Adrian Darveau, OMI
 Ajit Kaur Doel
 Naranjan S. Dhalla, 
 Tina Keeper 
 Sterling R. W. Lyon, 
 Frederick George McGuinness, 
 Leonore M. Saunders
 Murray Smith
 E. Jane Ursel

2003
 Monty Hall
 Elaine Ali
 Leonard A. Bateman
 James Arthur Coulter
 Charles E. Curtis, FCA
 Joseph Du, 
 Waldron N. Fox-Decent, 
 Wesley C. Lorimer
 Loreena McKennitt, 
 Arnold Naimark, 
 Nelia Premachuk
 Clarence Tillenius, 
 Larry Phillip "Phil" Fontaine

2004
 John Harvard, 
 Leonard Joseph Cariou
 Thérèse Champagne 
 Harvey Max Chochinov, FRSC FCAHS
 Henry G. Friesen, 
 Virginia Guiang
 Benjamin Hewak
 Vern Hildahl
 Samuel M. Katz 
 Arthur V. Mauro, 
 Don Robertson
 Val Werier, 
 June Marion James

2005
 Randy Bachman
 Gladys Evelyn Cook
 Albert D. Friesen
 Irene Grant
 Chander Gupta
 Edward Head
 Terrance Hind
 Martin Johnson
 Ovide Mercredi
 Kathleen M. Richardson
 Glenora Slimmon
 Maurice Strong

2006
 Neil Bardal
 Jennifer Botterill
 James W. Burns
 Albert Cerilli
 Eileen Collins
 Arnold Frieman
 Evelyn Hart
 Clara Hughes
 Cindy Klassen
 Donald Russell Pratt
 Len Smith
 Neil Young

2007
 Gail Asper
 Clifford H.C. Edwards
 Ivan Eyre
 Janice Filmon
 Elmer Hildebrand
 John Albert Jack
 Lynn B. Johnston
 Verna J. Kirkness
 June S. Menzies
 Ken Ploen
 Paul G. Thomas
 Ed Wood

2008
 John Bock
 Catherine (Myrtle) deMeulles
 David Glenn Friesen
 David Gislason
 Helen Preston Glass
 Romulo Magsino
 Robert Ronald McLean
 Sophia Rabliauskas
 Hartley Richardson
 Peter Sawatzky
 Evelyn Shapiro
 Muriel Smith

2009
  Abdo (Albert) El Tassi, C.M.
 Yhetta Miriam Gold, C.M.
 Kevin P. Kavanagh, C.M.
 Sylvia Kuzyk
 Philip S. Lee
 Guy Maddin
 Roland Mahé
 Joseph Meconse
 Sylvia Ostry, C.C.
 Frank Plummer, O.C.
 Corrine Scott
 Emőke Szathmáry, C.M.
 Josephine Wright

2010
 Norma Bailey
 Marjorie Blankstein, C.M.
 Gary Albert Doer
 David Grewar
 Elijah Harper
 Kerry L. Hawkins
 Betty Hopkins
 Kathryn Knowles
 C. Wilbert (Bert) Loewen
 Carmel Olson
 Robert (Bob) Smith
 Keith Ursel

2011
 Fred Penner
 Jim Carr
 Patrick Choy
 Art DeFehr
 Rayleen De Luca
 Henry Idonije
 Eugene Kostyra
 Raymond Lavallee
 Susan Lewis
 Kathy Mallett
 Raymond Poirier
 Miriam Toews

2012
 Mark Chipman
 Pauline Clarke
 James Coyne
 Darlene Dziewit
 Len Flett
 Étienne Gaboury
 Crystal Kolt
 Art Miki
 Randy Moffat
 Brian Postl
 Bob Silver
 Al Simmons
 Leslie Spillett
 Deborah Thorlakson

2013
 David Chartrand
 Francis Doyle
 Olga Fuga
 Helen Granger Young
 George Nicholas Heshka
 Tse Li Luk
 Diane Redsky
 H. Sanford Riley
 Allan Ronald
 Richard J. Scott
 Ray St. Germain
 Miriam Toews
 Eleanor Woitowicz

2014
 Lorraine Brandson
 Bob Brennan
 Tom Denton
 Don Duguid
 Sam Fabro
 Raymonde Gagne
 Allan Gotlieb
 Israel Idonije
 Bob Irving
 Jennifer Jones
 Hermann Lee
 Roland Penner
 Carole Vivier
 Doris Sarah Young

2015
 Rachel Alao
 Chad Allan
 Karen Beaudin
 Tom Cochrane
 Dian Cohen
 Wilma L. Derksen
 Dan Johnson
 Sheldon Kennedy
 Donald R. J. Mackey
 Mitch Podolak
 Khhem Kamarie (Monica) Singh
 Jonathan Toews

2016
 Paul Albrechtsen
Marileen Bartlett
Maria De Nardi
Dhali Dhaliwal
Chief Betsy Kennedy
Gary Kobinger
Wanda Koop
Reggie Leach
Bernadette Smith
Susan Thompson
Wanbdi Wakita

2017
 David Angus
 Marlene Bertrand
 Doreen Brownstone
 Selwyn (Sel) Burrows
 Philipp R. Ens
 Anne Lindsey
 Lisa Meeches
 Rey D. Pagtakhan
 Phillip James (Jim) Peebles
 Robert (Bob) Picken
 Paul Robson
 Beverly Suek

2018
 David Barnard
 Michael P. B. Belhumeur
 Jacqueline Blay
 Barbara Bruce
 Sara J. Israels
 Robert T. Kristjanson
 Bill Loewen
 Bernice Marmel
 Robb Nash
 Ken Opaleke
 Grant N. Pierce
 Cheryl Rockman-Greenberg

2019
 Vivian Bruce
 Jason Chuback
 Marcel Desautels
 James Ehnes
 Kathy Hildebrand
 Arvid Loewen
 Clarence Nepinak
 Steven Schipper
 Trudy Schroeder
 Harvey Sector
 Joy Smith
 Michael West

References

 Manitoba Historical Society - Members of the Order of Manitoba

Provincial and territorial orders of Canada